Andreas Drugge (born 20 January 1983) is a Swedish footballer who plays for Sportsklubben Stag as a forward.

Personal life
Drugge is married to Charlotte Hysén, daughter of the former captain of Liverpool FC Glenn Hysén and sister to Tobias Hysén.

Career 
Drugge was recruited by IF Elfsborg 1999. Already at the age of 17 he made his debut in the club's senior team . Andreas was considered out of many to be a Swedish football 's greatest talents . In IF Elfsborg he played with players like Anders Svensson, Samuel Holmén, Johan Wiland and Fredrik Berglund.

In 2006 was he transferred by Degerfors IF, where he was trained out by the United States ladiescoach Tony Gustafsson.

2008 Trelleborg FF signed him and it was here that his career took off. Trelleborg changed his position, let him play like a No. 10 and during those three seasons Andreas were noted for 20 goals and 14 assists.

2011 one of the biggest team in the Swedish history, IFK Göteborg, transferred Andreas and he signed a three years contract with them.

The Gothenburg club BK Häcken decided to buy Andreas for the season 2012. In this club Andreas played along with the striker Waris Majeed and had a brilliant collaboration.

During this period they chose to give Andreas a more defensive responsibility and used him as a playmaker. Nevertheless, he managed to record 12 points in the season 2013.

Ahead of the 2015 season, he moved to Norway to work a job outside of sports, and to play for third-tier team IF Fram Larvik.

References

External links
 

1983 births
Living people
Swedish footballers
Sweden under-21 international footballers
Sweden youth international footballers
Association football forwards
Allsvenskan players
BK Häcken players
IFK Göteborg players
Trelleborgs FF players
Degerfors IF players
Falkenbergs FF players
IF Elfsborg players
FK Tønsberg players
GAIS players
Swedish expatriate footballers
Expatriate footballers in Norway
Swedish expatriate sportspeople in Norway
People from Borås
Sportspeople from Västra Götaland County